The Mustermesse Basel (short "muba") was a fair in the city of Basel, Switzerland. The first fair took place in 1917, and the latest fair took place in 2019.

History 
The first fair was a demonstration of the industrial development of Switzerland and opened on April, 14 1917. It had 831 exhibitors spread out over 6,000 square meters, and exceeded expectations by hosting over 300,000 visitors.

In 1923, it was the site of a fire that completely destroyed the halls of the Mustermesse. Even before the fire, an architectural competition had been held to replace the provisional halls. Two new halls were built two years later.

The number of visitors increased rapidly over the years following the fire. In 1966, it had more than 1,000,000 visitors.

Information and data 
The fair provided a space for various companies to show and advertise their products.

The fair was normally held in the spring. 

In 2019 the fair had 236,619 visitors and 261 exhibits spread out over 132,000 square meters. Admission was free, which contributed to the high number of visitors.

Gallery

References

External links 

Events in Basel
Fairs in Switzerland
2019 endings